Guru Gobind Singh (born Gobind Das or Gobind Rai; 22 December 1666 – 7 October 1708) was the tenth and last human Sikh Guru. He was also a warrior, poet, and philosopher. At the age of nineafter his father (Guru Tegh Bahadur) was executed by Emperor Aurangzebhe was formally installed as the leader of the Sikhs. His four biological sons died during his lifetime – two in battle and two executed by the Mughal governor Wazir Khan.

Among his notable contributions to Sikhism are founding the Sikh warrior community called Khalsa in 1699 and introducing the Five Ks, the five articles of faith that Khalsa Sikhs wear at all times. Guru Gobind Singh is credited with the Dasam Granth whose hymns are a sacred part of Sikh prayers and Khalsa rituals. He is also credited as the one who finalized and enshrined the Guru Granth Sahib as Sikhism's primary scripture and eternal Guru.

Family and early life

Gobind Singh was the only son of Guru Tegh Bahadur, the ninth Sikh guru, and Mata Gujri. He was born in Patna, Bihar on 22 December 1666 while his father was visiting Bengal and Assam. His birth name was Gobind Das/Rai, and a shrine named Takht Sri Patna Harimandar Sahib marks the site of the house where he was born and spent the first four years of his life. In 1670, his family returned to Punjab, and in March 1672 they moved to Chakk Nanaki in the Himalayan foothills of north India, called the Sivalik range, where he was schooled.

His father Guru Tegh Bahadur was petitioned by Kashmiri Pandits in 1675 for protection from the fanatic persecution by Iftikar Khan, the Mughal governor of Kashmir under Mughal Emperor Aurangzeb. Tegh Bahadur considered a peaceful resolution by meeting Aurangzeb, but was cautioned by his advisors that his life may be at risk. The young Gobind Rai – to be known as Gobind Singh after 1699 – advised his father that no one was more worthy to lead and make a sacrifice than him. His father made the attempt, but was arrested then publicly beheaded in Delhi on 11 November 1675 under the orders of Aurangzeb for refusing to convert to Islam and the ongoing conflicts between Sikhism and the Islamic Empire. Before dying Guru Tegh Bahadur wrote a letter to Guru Gobind Rai (the letter was called Mahalla Dasven and it is part of the Guru Granth Sahib) as one last test to find the next Guru, after his father's martyrdom he was made the tenth Sikh Guru on Vaisakhi on 29 March 1676.

The education of Guru Gobind Singh continued after he became the 10th Guru, both in reading and writing as well as martial arts such as horse riding and archery. The Guru learned Farsi in a year and at the age of 6 started training in martial arts. In 1684, he wrote the Chandi di Var in Punjabi language – a legendary war between the good and the evil, where the good stands up against injustice and tyranny, as described in the ancient Sanskrit text Markandeya Purana. He stayed in Paonta, near the banks of river Yamuna, until 1685.

Guru Gobind Singh had three wives:
At age 10, he married Mata Jito on 21 June 1677 at Basantgaṛh, 10 km north of Anandpur. The couple had three sons: Jujhar Singh (b. 1691), Zorawar Singh (b. 1696) and Fateh Singh (b. 1699).
at age 17, he married Mata Sundari on 4 April 1684 at Anandpur. The couple had one son, Ajit Singh (b. 1687).
at age 33, he married Mata Sahib Devan on 15 April 1700 at Anandpur. They had no children, but she had an influential role in Sikhism. Guru Gobind Singh proclaimed her as the Mother of the Khalsa. The Guru initially rejected her marriage proposal he was married already and have four sons. The Sangat and the Guru's family agreed to the marriage. but Guru Gobind Singh made it clear that his relationship with Mata Sahib Diwan will be spiritual one and not physical

The life example and leadership of Guru Gobind Singh have been of historical importance to the Sikhs. He institutionalized the Khalsa (literally, Pure Ones), who played the key role in protecting the Sikhs long after his death, such as during the nine invasions of Panjab and the holy war led by Ahmad Shah Abdali from Afghanistan between 1747 and 1769.

Founding the Khalsa

In 1699, the Guru requested the Sikhs to congregate at Anandpur on Vaisakhi (the annual spring harvest festival). According to the Sikh tradition, he asked for a volunteer. One came forward, whom he took inside a tent. The Guru returned to the crowd alone, with a bloody sword. He asked for another volunteer, and repeated the same process of returning from the tent without anyone and with a bloodied sword four more times. After the fifth volunteer went with him into the tent, the Guru returned with all five volunteers, all safe. He called them the Panj Pyare and the first Khalsa in the Sikh tradition.

Guru Gobind Singh then mixed water and sugar into an iron bowl, stirring it with a double-edged sword to prepare what he called Amrit ("nectar"). He then administered this to the Panj Pyare, accompanied with recitations from the Adi Granth, thus founding the khande ka pahul (baptization ceremony) of a Khalsa – a warrior community. The Guru also gave them a new surname "Singh" (lion). After the first five Khalsa had been baptized, the Guru asked the five to baptize him as a Khalsa. This made the Guru the sixth Khalsa, and his name changed from Guru Gobind Rai to Guru Gobind Singh. This initiation ceremony replaced the charan pahul ritual practiced by the previous gurus, in which an initiate would drink the water either the Guru or a masand of the guru had dipped their right toe in.

Guru Gobind Singh initiated the Five K's tradition of the Khalsa,
 Kesh: uncut hair.
 Kangha: a wooden comb.
 Kara: an iron or steel bracelet worn on the wrist.
 Kirpan: a sword.
 Kacchera: short breeches.

He also announced a code of discipline for Khalsa warriors. Tobacco, eating 'halal' meat (a way of slaughtering in which the animal's throat is slit open and it is left to bleed before being slaughtered), fornication and adultery were forbidden. The Khalsas also agreed to never interact with those who followed rivals or their successors. The co-initiation of men and women from different castes into the ranks of Khalsa also institutionalized the principle of equality in Sikhism regardless of one's caste or gender. Guru Gobind Singh's significance to the Sikh tradition has been very important, as he institutionalized the Khalsa, resisted the ongoing persecution by the Mughal Empire, and continued the defence of dharma, by which he meant True Religion, against the assault of Aurangzeb.

He introduced ideas that indirectly challenged the discriminatory taxes imposed by the Mughal authorities. For example, Aurangzeb had imposed taxes on non-Muslims that were collected from the Sikhs as well, the jizya (poll tax on non-Muslims), pilgrim tax, and Bhaddar tax – the last being a tax to be paid by anyone following the Hindu ritual of shaving the head after the death of a loved one and cremation. Guru Gobind Singh declared that Khalsa does not need to continue this practice, because Bhaddar is not dharam, but a bharam (illusion). Not shaving the head also meant not having to pay the taxes by Sikhs who lived in Delhi and other parts of the Mughal Empire. However, the new code of conduct also led to internal disagreements between Sikhs in the 18th century, particularly between the Nanakpanthi and the Khalsa.

Guru Gobind Singh had a deep respect for the Khalsa and stated that there is no difference between the True Guru and the sangat (panth). Before his founding of the Khalsa, the Sikh movement had used the Sanskrit word Sisya (literally, disciple or student), but the favored term thereafter became Khalsa. Additionally, prior to the Khalsa, the Sikh congregations across India had a system of Masands appointed by the Sikh Gurus. The Masands led the local Sikh communities, local temples, and collected wealth and donations for the Sikh cause. Guru Gobind Singh concluded that the Masands system had become corrupt, he abolished them and introduced a more centralized system with the help of Khalsa that was under his direct supervision. These developments created two groups of Sikhs, those who initiated as Khalsa, and others who remained Sikhs but did not undertake the initiation. The Khalsa Sikhs saw themselves as a separate religious entity, while the Nanak-panthi Sikhs retained their different perspective.

The Khalsa warrior community tradition started by Guru Gobind Singh has contributed to modern scholarly debate on pluralism within Sikhism. His tradition has survived into the modern times, with initiated Sikh referred to as Khalsa Sikh, while those who do not get baptized referred to as Sahajdhari Sikhs.

Sikh scriptures

Piara Singh Padam in his Sri Guru Gobind Singh Ji de Darbari Ratan highlights that Guru Gobind Singh gave as much regard to the pen as to the sword.
Guru Gobind Singh is credited in the Sikh tradition with finalizing the Kartarpur Pothi (manuscript) of the Guru Granth Sahib – the primary scripture of Sikhism. The final version did not accept the extraneous hymns in other versions, and included the compositions of his father Guru Tegh Bahadur. Guru Gobind Singh also declared this text to be the eternal Guru for Sikhs.

Guru Gobind Singh is also credited with the Dasam Granth. It is a controversial religious text considered to be the second scripture by some Sikhs, and of disputed authority to other Sikhs. The standard edition of the text contains 1,428 pages with 17,293 verses in 18 sections. The Dasam Granth includes hymns, mythological tales from Hindu texts, a celebration of the feminine in the form of goddess Durga, erotic fables, an autobiography, secular stories from the Puranas and the Mahabharata, letters to others such as the Mughal emperor, as well as reverential discussion of warriors and theology.

According to the Bansavlinama, written in 1755 by Kesar Singh Chibbar, Sikhs requested that Guru Gobind Singh merge Dasam Granth with the Guru Granth Sahib. Guru Gobind Singh responded to the request by saying, "This is the Adi Guru Granth; The root book. That one (Dasam Granth) is only for my diversion. Let this be kept in the mind and let the two stay separate."

The Dasam Granth has a significant role in the initiation and the daily life of devout Khalsa Sikhs. Parts of its compositions such as the Jaap Sahib, Tav-Prasad Savaiye and Benti Chaupai are the daily prayers (Nitnem) and sacred liturgical verses used in the initiation of Khalsa Sikhs.

Wars

The period following the execution of Guru Tegh Bahadur – the father of Guru Gobind Singh, was a period where the Mughal Empire under Aurangzeb was an increasingly hostile enemy of the Sikh people. The Sikh resisted, led by Gobind Singh, and the Muslim-Sikh conflicts peaked during this period. Both Mughal administration and Aurangzeb's army had an active interest in Guru Gobind Singh. Aurangzeb issued an order to exterminate Guru Gobind Singh and his family.

Guru Gobind Singh believed in a Dharam Yudh (war in defence of righteousness), something that is fought as a last resort, neither out of a wish for revenge nor for greed nor for any destructive goals. To Guru Gobind Singh, one must be prepared to die to stop tyranny, end persecution, and to defend one's own religious values. He led fourteen wars with these objectives, but never took captives nor damaged anyone's place of worship.

Significant battles

Guru Gobind Singh fought 13 battles against the Mughal Empire and the kings of Siwalik Hills.
 Battle of Bhangani (1688), which states chapter 8 of Gobind Singh's Bicitra Natak, when Fateh Shah, along with mercenary commanders Hayat Khan and Najabat Khan, attacked his forces without any purpose. The Guru was aided by the forces of Kripal (his maternal uncle) and a Brahmin named Daya Ram, both of whom he praises as heroes in his text. The Guru's cousin named Sango Shah was killed in the battle, a cousin from Guru Hargobind's daughter.
 Battle of Nadaun (1691), against the Islamic armies of Mian Khan and his son Alif Khan, who were defeated by the allied forces of Guru Gobind Singh, Bhim Chand and other Hindu kings of Himalayan foothills. The non-Muslims aligned to the Guru had refused to pay tribute to the Islamic officials based in Jammu.
In 1693, Aurangzeb was fighting the Hindu Marathas in the Deccan region of India, and he issued orders that Guru Gobind Singh and Sikhs should be prevented from gathering in Anandpur in large numbers.
 Battle of Anandpur (1695)
 Battle of Guler (1696), first against the Muslim commander Dilawar Khan's son Rustam Khan, near Sutlej river, where the Guru teamed up with the Hindu king of Guler and routed the Muslim army. The commander sent his general Hussain Khan against the armies of the Guru and the Guler kingdom, a war fought near Pathankot, and Hussain Khan was defeated and killed by the joint forces.
 Battle of Anandpur (1700), against the Mughal army of Aurangzeb, who had sent 10,000 soldiers under the command of Painda Khan and Dina Beg. In direct combat between Guru Gobind Singh and Painda Khan, the latter was killed. His death led to the Mughal army fleeing the battlefield.
 First Siege of Anandpur, The hill Rajas of northern Punjab regrouped after defeat at Anandpur the previous year and resumed their campaign against Sikh Guru Gobind Singh, joining forces with Gujar and other tribesmens to besiege Anandpur, northeast of Ludhiana. Gujar leader Jagatullah was killed on the first day and the Rajas were driven off after a brilliant defence led by the Guru's son Ajit Singh.
 Battle of Nirmohgarh (1702), against the forces of Aurangzeb, led by Wazir Khan reinforced by the hilly Rajas of the Sivalik Hills on the banks of Nirmohgarh. The battle continued for two days, with heavy losses on both sides, and Wazir Khan army left the battlefield.
 Battle of Basoli (1702), against the Mughal army; named after the kingdom of Basoli whose Raja Dharampul supported the Guru in the battle. The Mughal army was supported by rival kingdom of Kahlur led by Raja Ajmer Chand. The battle ended when the two sides reached a tactical peace.
 First Battle of Chamkaur (1702), Mughal Army was repulsed. 
 First Battle of Anandpur (1704), Mughal Emperor Aurangzeb sent a fresh force into northern Punjab under General Saiyad Khan, later replaced by Ramjan Khan. Ramjan was mortally wounded in further very heavy fighting around the Sikh stronghold at Anandpur, northeast of Ludhiana, and his force again withdrew. 
 Second Battle of Anandpur, According to scholars, this battle was triggered by the proliferation of armed Sikhs in Anandpur, the increasing numbers creating a shortage of supplies. This led the Sikhs to raid local villages for supplies, food, and forage, which in turn dramatically frustrated the local pahari rajas who forged alliances and mounted an attack on Guru Gobind Singh's patrimony. The Mughal general was fatally wounded by Sikh soldiers, and the army withdrew. Aurangzeb then sent a larger army with two generals, Wazir Khan and Zaberdast Khan in May 1704, to destroy the Sikh resistance. The approach the Islamic army took in this battle was to lay a protracted siege against Anandpur, from May to December, cutting off all food and other supplies moving in and out, along with repeated battles. Some Sikh men deserted the Guru during the Anandpur siege in 1704 and escaped to their homes where their women shamed them and they rejoined the Guru's army and died fighting with him in 1705. Towards the end, the Guru, his family, and followers accepted an offer by Aurangzeb of safe passage out of Anandpur. However, as they left Anandpur in two batches, they were attacked, and one of the batches with Mata Gujari and Guru's two sons – Zorawar Singh aged 8 and Fateh Singh aged 5 – were taken captive by the Mughal army. Both his children were executed by burying them alive into a wall. The grandmother Mata Gujari died there as well.
 Battle of Sarsa (1704), against the Mughal army led by general Wazir Khan; the Muslim commander had conveyed Aurangzeb's promise of a safe passage to Guru Gobind Singh and his family in early December. However, when the Guru accepted the offer and left, Wazir Khan took captives, executed them and pursued the Guru. The retreating troops he was with were repeatedly attacked from behind, with heavy casualties to the Sikhs, particularly while crossing the Sarsa river.
 Battle of Chamkaur (1704) Regarded as one of the most important battles in Sikh history. It was against the Mughal army led by Nahar Khan; the Muslim commander was killed, while on Sikh side the remaining two elder sons of the Guru – Ajit Singh and Jujhar Singh, along with other Sikh soldiers were killed in this battle.
 Battle of Muktsar (1705), the Guru's army was re-attacked by the Mughal army, being hunted down by general Wazir Khan, in the arid area of Khidrana-ki-Dhab. The Mughals were blocked again, but with many losses of Sikh lives – particularly the famous Chalis Mukte (literally, the "forty liberated ones"), and this was the last battle led by Guru Gobind Singh. The place of battle called Khidrana was renamed about a 100 years later by Ranjit Singh to Mukt-sar (literally, "lake of liberation"), after the term "Mukt" (moksha) of the ancient Indian tradition, in honour of those who gave their lives for the cause of liberation.

Mughal accounts
The Muslim historians of the Mughal court wrote about Guru Gobind Singh as well as the geopolitics of the times he lived in, and these official Persian accounts were readily available and the basis of colonial era English-language description of Sikh history.

According to Dhavan, the Persian texts that were composed by Mughal court historians during the lifetime of Guru Gobind Singh were hostile to him but presented the Mughal perspective. They believed that the religious Guru tradition of Sikhs had been corrupted by him, through the creation of a military order willing to resist the Imperial army. Dhavan writes that some Persian writers who wrote decades or a century after the death of Guru Gobind Singh evolved from relying entirely on court histories of the Mughals which disparage the Guru, to including stories from the Sikh gurbilas text that praise the Guru.

The Mughal accounts suggest that the Muslim commanders viewed the Sikh panth as one divided into sects with different loyalties.

Relationship with other religious groups 

As a result of the violent hostility between the Sikhs and the Mughal armies, Guru Gobind Singh ordered the social segregation of the Khalsa from the Muslims, the sentiments of which are reiterated in the contemporary and posthumous rahit-namas. To a lesser extent, injunctions were also made prohibiting the partake in certain Hindu rituals and beliefs as well as against schismatic Sikh factions opposed to the orthodox Khalsa community.

Post-War years 

After the Second Battle of Anandpur in 1704, the Guru and his remaining soldiers moved and stayed in different spots including hidden in places such as the Machhiwara jungle of southern Panjab.

Some of the various spots in north, west, and central India where the Guru lived after 1705, include Hehar with Kirpal Das (maternal uncle), Manuke, Mehdiana, Chakkar, Takhtupura, and Madhe and Dina (Malwa (Punjab) region). He stayed with relatives or trusted Sikhs such as the three grandsons of Rai Jodh, a devotee of Guru Har Gobind.

Zafarnama

Guru Gobind Singh saw the war conduct of Aurangzeb and his army against his family and his people as a betrayal of a promise, unethical, unjust, and impious. After all of Guru Gobind Singh's children had been killed by the Mughal army and the battle of Muktsar, the Guru wrote a defiant letter in Persian to Aurangzeb, titled Zafarnama (literally, "epistle of victory"), a letter which the Sikh tradition considers important towards the end of the 19th century.

The Guru's letter was stern yet conciliatory to Aurangzeb. He indicted the Mughal Emperor and his commanders in spiritual terms, and accused them of a lack of morality both in governance and in the conduct of war. The letter predicted that the Mughal Empire would soon end, because it persecutes, and is full of abuse, falsehood, and immorality. The letter is spiritually rooted in Guru Gobind Singh's beliefs about justice and dignity without fear.

There are two narratives of why the Guru went to Nanded, one is that he was further helping Bahadur Shah suppress the Mahrathas and Bhoi Dynasty leaders or he went there just to preach Sikhism as he had just surprised the rebellion of Kam Bakhsh and the soldiers were tired and decided to camp. The second is the more popular narrative.

Death of family members

Guru Gobind Singh's four sons, also referred to as Chaar Sahibzaade (the four princes), were killed during his lifetime – the elder two in a battle with Mughals, and the younger two executed by the Mughal governor of Sirhind.

Guru and his two elder sons had escaped the siege of Anandpur in December 1704 and reached Chamkaur, but they were pursued by a large Mughal army. In the ensuing battle, Guru's elder sons, also called the 'Vaade Sahibzaade' fought bravely, but the Mughal army was much larger and well equipped.
While Guru was taken to a safe place, Guru's elder sons, Sahibzada Ajit Singh aged 17, and Jujhar Singh aged 13 were killed in the Battle of Chamkaur in December 1704 against the Mughal army.

Guru's mother Mata Gujri and his two younger sons got separated from the Guru after escaping the Mughal siege of Anandpur in December 1704; and were later arrested by the forces of Wazir Khan, the Mughal governor of Sirhind. The younger pair, called the 'Chotte Sahibzaade', along with their grandmother were imprisoned in an Open Tower (Thanda Burj), in chilling winter days. Around 26 and 27 December 1704, the younger sons, Sahibzada Fateh Singh aged 6 and Zorawar Singh aged 9, were offered a safe passage if they converted to Islam, which they refused; and subsequently, Wazir Khan ordered them to be bricked alive in the wall. Mata Gujri fainted on hearing about her grandsons' death and died shortly thereafter.

His adopted son Zorawar Singh Palit whose real name is unknown died in 1708 near Chittorgarh Fort in a skirmish with local soldiers. According to Sainapati, Zorawar Singh Palit had managed to escape in the Battle of Chamkaur and later met the Guru in Rajputana after which he got in a minor scuffle at Chittorgarh and died.

According to Sikh historians, Guru Gobind Singh took the harsh news about the execution of his sons with stoic calm, and wrote 'What use is it to put out a few sparks when you raise a mighty flame instead?'.

Final days 

Aurangzeb died in 1707, and immediately a succession struggle began between his sons who attacked each other. Guru Gobind Singh supported Bahadur Shah in the Battle of Jajau by sending 200 – 300 Sikhs under Bhai Dharam Singh and later joining the battle themselves. According to Sikh sources it was Guru Gobind Singh who killed Azam Shah. the official successor Bahadur Shah,  invited Guru Gobind Singh with his army to meet him in person in the Deccan region of India for reconciliation. Guru Gobind Singh hoped to get Anandpur, his former stronghold back, and remained close to the imperial camp for nearly a year. His appeals for the restoration of his lands turned out to be ineffectual however as Bahadur Shah went on postponing any restoration to the status quo ante as he was not willing to offend either the Guru or the hill rajas.

Wazir Khan, a Muslim army commander and the Nawab of Sirhind, against whose army the Guru had fought several wars, commissioned two Afghans, Jamshed Khan, and Wasil Beg, to follow the Guru's army as it moved for the meeting with Bahadur Shah, and then assassinate the Guru. The two secretly pursued the Guru whose troops were in the Deccan area of India, and entered the camp when the Sikhs had been stationed near river Godavari for months. They gained access to the Guru and Jamshed Khan stabbed him two times resulting in a fatal wound at Nanded. Some scholars state that the assassin who killed Guru Gobind Singh may not have been sent by Wazir Khan, but was instead sent by the Mughal army that was staying nearby.

According to Senapati's Sri Gur Sobha, an early 18th-century writer, the fatal wounds of the Guru was one below his heart. The Guru fought back and killed the assassin, while the assassin's companion was killed by the Sikh guards as he tried to escape.

The Guru died of his wounds a few days later on 7 October 1708 His death fuelled a long and bitter war of the Sikhs with the Mughals.

According to the Bansavalinama by Kesar Singh Chibber written in 1768, the Guru's last words were, "The Granth is the Guru and it will bring you to Akal. The Guru is the Khalsa and the Khalsa is the Guru. The seat has been given to Sri Sahib Mata Devi. Love each other and expand the community. Follow the words of the Granth. The Sikh that follows Sikhi shall be with the Guru. Follow the conduct of the Guru. Always remain with Waheguru."

Dohra Mahalla Dasvan (10) 

While it is generally believed that Guru Gobind Singh did not add any of his own compositions to the Guru Granth Sahib, there are some who argue that a single rhyming couplet, known as a Dohra, of the tenth Guru, titled Dohra Mahalla Dasvan (10), near the end of the scripture on page 1429 is the work of Guru Gobind Singh.

The composition in-question is as follows:

In popular culture 
While Sikh Gurus are generally not portrayed on screen due to certain beliefs in Sikhism, a number of Indian films surrounding Guru Gobind Singh's life have been made. These include:
Sarbans Dani Guru Gobind Singh, a 1998 Indian Punjabi-language drama film directed by Ram Maheshwari. The film follows Guru's life but he is not directly portrayed by an actor.
Chaar Sahibzaade, a 2014 Indian computer-animated film by Harry Baweja. It is based on the sacrifices of the sons of Guru Gobind Singh – Ajit Singh, Jujhar Singh, Jorawar Singh, and Fateh Singh.
Chaar Sahibzaade: Rise of Banda Singh Bahadur, a 2016 Indian computer-animated film by Harry Baweja. It is a sequel to Chaar Sahibzaade and follows Baba Banda Singh Bahadur's fight against the Mughals under the guidance of Guru Gobind Singh.

See also

 List of places named after Guru Gobind Singh
 The 52 Hukams of Guru Gobind Singh
 Bhai Jiwan Singh
 Banda Singh Bahadur

References
Informational notes

Citations

Bibliography

Further reading

 
 
 Singh, Prof. Surinderjit, Guru Gobind Singh's Zafarnamah Transliteration and Poetic Rendering in English. Singh Brothers, Amritsar. 2003. .
 Sri Dasam Granth Sahib: Questions and Answers: The book on Sri Dasam Granth Sahib

External links

1666 births
1708 deaths
Sikh warriors
Gobind Singh
Punjabi people
Writers from Patna
Poets from Bihar
17th-century Indian poets
18th-century Indian poets